The triathlon competitions at the 2015 European Games, in Baku, were held on 13 and 14 June 2015. A total of 105 athletes, 57 men and 48 women, competed.

Qualification

A maximum of 12 NOCs may qualify three athletes per event. Other NOCs may have a maximum of two quota places per event. Three quota places will be allocated to the first 12 nations to have three athletes eligible through the qualification process.

Olympic qualification

Triathlon is one of the events where performance in the 2015 Games impact on Olympic Qualification. In the case of triathlon, the winner of each event will secure a quota place for their NOC for the 2016 Summer Olympics.

Medalists

Medal table

Participating nations 
A total of 105 athletes from 36 nations competed in triathlon at the 2015 European Games:

References

 
Sports at the 2015 European Games
European Games
2015